Arnold Sinisalu (born 20 February 1970 in Kärdla) is an Estonian police officer and lawyer.

Since 1993, he has worked at Estonian Internal Security Service. Since 2013, he is the chief of Estonian Internal Security Service.

In 2021, he was awarded with Order of the Cross of the Eagle, II class.

References

Living people
1970 births
Estonian civil servants
Estonian police officers
University of Tartu alumni
Recipients of the Military Order of the Cross of the Eagle, Class II
Recipients of the Military Order of the Cross of the Eagle, Class IV
People from Kärdla
20th-century Estonian lawyers
21st-century Estonian lawyers